Cheshmeh Kuzan-e Olya (also Romanized as Cheshmeh Kūzān-e ‘Olyā; also known as Cheshmeh Kūzān-e Bālā and Kuzan Olya (Persian: کوزان عليا), also Romanized as Kūzān ‘Olyā) is a village in Kakavand-e Gharbi Rural District, Kakavand District, Delfan County, Lorestan Province, Iran. At the 2006 census, its population was 279, in 56 families.

References 

Towns and villages in Delfan County